Musquodoboit Harbour is a rural community located in Nova Scotia, Canada within the Halifax Regional Municipality.
The community is situated on the Eastern Shore at the mouth of the Musquodoboit River. The community lies 45 kilometres east of downtown Halifax. With a hospital, RCMP detachment, postal outlet, schools, recreational center, library, municipal office and other services, Musquodoboit Harbour is a serve centre for many of the surrounding communities.

Etymology
Musquodoboit means foaming to the sea, flowing out square or rolling out in foam, or suddenly widening out after a narrow entrance at its mouth. The community is an anglicized version of the Mi’kmaq word Moosekudoboogwek or Muskoodeboogwek.

History 
The community was settled in the 1780s mainly by Loyalists. Through the late 18th and early 19th centuries many settlers from Scotland, England and Germany immigrated to the area and they still have descendants in the area, evidenced by prominent family names such as Tibbo, Rowlings, Anderson, Gaetz, and Bayers.

Transportation history
Much early travel was by water as roads were rough. Beginning in 1852, the stage coach travelled from Musquodoboit Harbour to Dartmouth at a cost of 5 shillings. The first automobile was owned by Dr. Kennedy in 1909. The Dartmouth Eastern Railway commenced in 1912 to carry lumber and lime from Middle Musquodoboit to Dartmouth. A station was completed in 1918 and today houses the Musquodoboit Harbour Railway Museum, which also serves as the local tourism office in summer. The museum grounds contain a passenger car, snow plow from the Dominion Atlantic Railway and a caboose from the Canadian National Railway. The museum is on the Canadian Register of Historic Places.

Other services
The Rural Telephone system came into use around 1909.

The Fire Department
It all began one evening in 1957 when Garth Young was sitting at the table playing crib with friends. His sister ran in and said she could see flames in a window upstairs as she was driving down the road. Garth and his father each grabbed a bucket of water and ran upstairs, but there was nothing they could do. There was no fire department in Musquodoboit Harbour. They called Lands and Forests (now called the Department of Natural Resources) who showed up later with a portable pump and some hose. But by now, the two-story house was in flames and the dozen family members who lived there could only watch helplessly as it burned to the ground. The loss motivated Garth Young and other people in the community to establish their own fire department. By 1960 Garth Young was clearing land for the new station. A year later the Musquodoboit Harbour Volunteer Fire Department was born and he became one of its original members. The Musquodoboit Harbour Volunteer Fire Department formed in 1961 with the fire hall opening on October 6, 1964. The first piece of equipment they had was a trailer with a pump on it. It had compartments on each side into which they were able to put extra equipment, such as hoses. The first truck they had was a 1957 milk truck that they bought in 1963 from a farmer. The Fire Department Ladies Auxiliary formed in February 1967.

In 1996, Halifax, Dartmouth, Bedford, and the County of Halifax amalgamated into what is today the Halifax Regional Municipality. Dozens of fire departments merged into the Halifax Regional Fire & Emergency Services, and the Musquodoboit Harbour Volunteer Fire Department received the designation of "Halifax Regional Fire & Emergency, Station 24." On June 13, 2008, The station was actively involved in the Porter's Lake fire, one of the biggest forest fire in Nova Scotia's history. Members spent 5 days working side-by-side with the Department of Natural Resources. On October 6, 2008, the station was staffed with career personnel for the very first time. From October 6, 2008 to December 31, 2008, the crew was made up of a career Lieutenant and a casual worker taken from the station's own volunteers. On January 1, 2009 the station was officially staffed with career personnel, Monday to Friday, with anywhere between 2 and 4 people, depending on the needs.

Martinique Beach Provincial Park
Located at the end of the East Petpeswick Rd, Martinique Beach is the longest sandy beach in Nova Scotia. This 5 kilometre long beach is a provincial park which boasts both picnic and swimming facilities. The excellent surf conditions at Martinique Beach draw in surfers from all over. The beach is named after Prince Edward who took part in the 1794 Capture of Martinique.

There is a wildlife sanctuary adjacent to Martinique Beach. Canada Geese and Black Ducks can often be seen during migratory periods. There is even a protected nesting area for the Piping Plover, an endangered species.

The site is an Important Bird Area.

Yacht Club 
Just 2 kilometers down the East Petpeswick Road is Petpeswick Yacht Club. PYC is home to a learn-to-sail program, small marina and a kayaking program. The yacht club hosts an annual regatta-the Shearwater to Petpeswick Race, Canada Day festivities and a number of dances and social events throughout the year. The clubhouse was newly renovated in 2011 and is available for private hire.

Churches 
 Jeddore Baptist Church
 Kingdom's Hall of Jehovah's Witnesses
 Marine Drive Pentecostal Church
 Musquodoboit Harbour Presbyterian Church
 St James Anglican Church Hall
 St. Phillip Neri Roman Catholic Church
 United Church of Canada, Musquodoboit Harbour
 St Thomas' Anglican Church, Musquodoboit Harbour

Transportation 
 Trunk 7
 Highway 107
 Route 357
 East Petpeswick Road
 West Petpeswick Road

Communications 
 The postal Code is  B0J 2L0.
 The Telephone exchange is 902  889, 891 - Bell Aliant; 342 - Eastlink; 878 - Rogers

Demographics 
 Total Population - 977
 Total Dwellings  - 1364 
 Total Land Area  - 207.042 km²

Schools 
 Eastern Shore District High School (10 to 12)
Oyster Pond Academy (P-9)

References

External links 
Musquodoboit Harbour Railway Museum
Musquodoboit Trailways Association
HRM Community Information Page
Halifax Public Libraries - Musquodoboit Harbour Branch
Petpeswick Yacht Club
Eastern Shore Recreation Commission
Explore HRM
Eastern Shore Jr. Mariners Hockey Club

Communities in Halifax, Nova Scotia
Important Bird Areas of Nova Scotia